Vjosa or Aous is a river in Albania and Greece.

Aoos, or Aous may refer to ancient peoples or locations:
Aous (King) was the first king of ancient Cyprus
Aous (Cyprus), a river in ancient Cyprus
Aous (mountain), a mountain in ancient Cyprus
Aous or Aoos is an epithet or name of Adonis in ancient Cyprus